This page lists all described species of the spider family Gallieniellidae accepted by the World Spider Catalog :

Austrachelas

Austrachelas Lawrence, 1938
 A. bergi Haddad, Lyle, Bosselaers & Ramírez, 2009 — South Africa
 A. entabeni Haddad & Mbo, 2017 — South Africa
 A. incertus Lawrence, 1938 (type) — South Africa
 A. kalaharinus Haddad, Lyle, Bosselaers & Ramírez, 2009 — South Africa
 A. merwei Haddad, Lyle, Bosselaers & Ramírez, 2009 — South Africa
 A. natalensis Lawrence, 1942 — South Africa
 A. pondoensis Haddad, Lyle, Bosselaers & Ramírez, 2009 — South Africa
 A. reavelli Haddad, Lyle, Bosselaers & Ramírez, 2009 — South Africa
 A. sexoculatus Haddad, Lyle, Bosselaers & Ramírez, 2009 — South Africa
 A. wassenaari Haddad, Lyle, Bosselaers & Ramírez, 2009 — South Africa

Drassodella

Drassodella Hewitt, 1916
 D. amatola Mbo & Haddad, 2019 — South Africa
 D. aurostriata Mbo & Haddad, 2019 — South Africa
 D. baviaans Mbo & Haddad, 2019 — South Africa
 D. flava Mbo & Haddad, 2019 — South Africa
 D. guttata Mbo & Haddad, 2019 — South Africa
 D. lotzi Mbo & Haddad, 2019 — South Africa
 D. maculata Mbo & Haddad, 2019 — South Africa
 D. melana Tucker, 1923 — South Africa
 D. montana Mbo & Haddad, 2019 — South Africa
 D. purcelli Tucker, 1923 — South Africa
 D. quinquelabecula Tucker, 1923 — South Africa
 D. salisburyi Hewitt, 1916 (type) — South Africa
 D. septemmaculata (Strand, 1909) — South Africa
 D. tenebrosa Lawrence, 1938 — South Africa
 D. tolkieni Mbo & Haddad, 2019 — South Africa
 D. transversa Mbo & Haddad, 2019 — South Africa
 D. trilineata Mbo & Haddad, 2019 — South Africa
 D. vasivulva Tucker, 1923 — South Africa
 D. venda Mbo & Haddad, 2019 — South Africa

Galianoella

Galianoella Goloboff, 2000
 G. leucostigma (Mello-Leitão, 1941) (type) — Argentina

Gallieniella

Gallieniella Millot, 1947
 G. betroka Platnick, 1984 — Madagascar
 G. blanci Platnick, 1984 — Madagascar
 G. jocquei Platnick, 1984 — Comoros
 G. mygaloides Millot, 1947 (type) — Madagascar

Legendrena

Legendrena Platnick, 1984
 L. angavokely Platnick, 1984 (type) — Madagascar
 L. perinet Platnick, 1984 — Madagascar
 L. rolandi Platnick, 1984 — Madagascar
 L. rothi Platnick, 1995 — Madagascar
 L. spiralis Platnick, 1995 — Madagascar
 L. steineri Platnick, 1990 — Madagascar
 L. tamatave Platnick, 1984 — Madagascar

Meedo

Meedo Main, 1987
 M. bluff Platnick, 2002 — Australia (New South Wales)
 M. booti Platnick, 2002 — Australia (New South Wales)
 M. broadwater Platnick, 2002 — Australia (Queensland)
 M. cohuna Platnick, 2002 — eastern Australia
 M. flinders Platnick, 2002 — Australia (South Australia)
 M. gympie Platnick, 2002 — Australia (Queensland, New South Wales)
 M. harveyi Platnick, 2002 — Australia (Western Australia)
 M. houstoni Main, 1987 (type) — Australia (Western Australia)
 M. mullaroo Platnick, 2002 — Australia (South Australia, Queensland to Victoria)
 M. munmorah Platnick, 2002 — Australia (New South Wales)
 M. ovtsharenkoi Platnick, 2002 — Australia (Western Australia)
 M. yarragin Platnick, 2002 — Australia (Western Australia)
 M. yeni Platnick, 2002 — Australia (Western Australia, South Australia, Victoria)

Neato

Neato Platnick, 2002
 N. arid Platnick, 2002 — Australia (Western Australia)
 N. barrine Platnick, 2002 — Australia (Queensland)
 N. beerwah Platnick, 2002 — Australia (Queensland, New South Wales)
 N. kioloa Platnick, 2002 — Australia (New South Wales, Victoria)
 N. palms Platnick, 2002 — Australia (New South Wales)
 N. raveni Platnick, 2002 — Australia (Queensland)
 N. walli Platnick, 2002 (type) — Australia (Queensland, New South Wales, Victoria)

Oreo

Oreo Platnick, 2002
 O. bushbay Platnick, 2002 — Australia (Western Australia)
 O. capensis Platnick, 2002 — Australia (Western Australia)
 O. kidman Platnick, 2002 — Australia (Northern Territory)
 O. muncoonie Platnick, 2002 — Australia (Queensland)
 O. renmark Platnick, 2002 (type) — Australia (South Australia, Queensland to Victoria)

Peeto

Peeto Platnick, 2002
 P. rodmani Platnick, 2002 (type) — Australia (Queensland)

Questo

Questo Platnick, 2002
 Q. annuello Platnick, 2002 (type) — Australia (Victoria)

References

Gallieniellidae